Cap Rosa Lighthouse is a lighthouse at El Kala, Algeria.

See also
List of lighthouses in Algeria

References

Lighthouses in Algeria